Canada competed at the 2018 Commonwealth Games in Gold Coast, Australia from 4 April – 15 April 2018. It was Canada's 21st appearance at the Commonwealth Games, having competed at every Games since their inception in 1930.

On 6 October 2016, two time Commonwealth Games gold medalist Claire Carver-Dias was named as the chef de mission of the team.

For the first time ever, there has been entry quotas set for all sports and therefore each country is restricted in the number of athletes it could enter.

Canada's team consisted of 282 athletes competing in 17 sports. The team consisted of 137 male athletes and 146 female athletes. This included a record 21 para-sport athletes. Canada competed in all sports on the program except netball, which it failed to qualify in. Also, Canada did not qualify an athlete in the discipline of powerlifting.

On 28 February 2018, diver Meaghan Benfeito was named as the country's flag bearer at the opening ceremony.

The goal of the Canadian team was at least 100 medals to be won across all sports.

Competitors
The following is the list of number of competitors participating at the Games per sport/discipline.

Medalists

|  style="text-align:left; vertical-align:top;"|

| width="22%" align="left" valign="top" |

Athletics (track and field)

Canada's athletics team was given a quota of 45 athletes (36 able-bodied and 9 para athletes). However, this was later increased by one by Commonwealth Games Canada. The official team  was later announced on 10 January 2018 and consisted of 26 men and 20 women. Potential medallist Andre De Grasse withdrew from the team in March 2018 and was replaced with Bismark Boateng. Brendon Rodney did not compete in any events.

Men
Track & road events

Field events

Combined events – Decathlon

Women
Track & road events

Field events

Combined events – Heptathlon

Badminton

Canada's badminton team consisted of eight athletes (four male and four female). The team was announced on 16 March 2018.

Singles

Doubles

Mixed team

Roster

Jason Ho-Shue
Rachel Honderich
Michelle Li
Ty Alexander Lindeman
Brittney Tam
Kristen Tsai
Nyl Yakura
Brian Yang

Pool D

Quarterfinals

Finished in an equal fifth position.

Basketball

Canada qualified a men's and women's basketball teams for a total of 24 athletes (12 men and 12 women). Both teams qualified by being ranked in the top three in the Commonwealth. This will mark the country's debut in the sport at the Commonwealth Games. Canada did not compete in the sport at its only appearance in 2006 in Melbourne. Both of Canada's teams were announced on 20 March 2018 and are developmental teams consisting of young players.

Men's tournament

Roster

Justus Alleyn
Mambi Diawara
Ammanuel Diressa
Mamadou Gueye
David Kapinga
Conor Morgan
Jean-Victor Mukama
Erik Nissen
Jean Emmanuel Pierre-Charles
Grant Shephard
Mike Shoveller
Munis Tutu

Pool A

Qualifying finals

Semifinals

Gold medal match

Women's tournament

Roster

Jacey Bailey
Niyah Becker
Danielle Boiago
Shay Colley
Paige Crozon
Ruth Hamblin
Alex Kiss-Rusk
Summer Masikewich
Ceejay Nofuente
Daneesha Provo
Merissah Russell
Catherine Traer

Pool A

Semifinal

Bronze medal match

Beach volleyball

Canada qualified a men's and women's beach volleyball team for a total of four athletes. The two pairs were announced in January 2018.

Boxing

Canada's boxing team of seven athletes (three men and four women) was named on 12 December 2017. In February 2018, Mandy Bujold withdrew from the team and was replaced by Marie-Jeanne Parent.

Men

Women

Cycling

Canada's cycling team consisted of 18 cyclists, nine men and nine women. The team was officially named on 24 January 2018. On 16 February 2018, Tegan Cochrane withdrew from the team and was replaced with Lauriane Genest. All cyclists competing in the road events are also scheduled to compete in the track events.

Road
Men

Women

Track
Sprint

Keirin

Time trial

Pursuit

Points race

Scratch race

Mountain biking
Canada sent three mountain bikers (1 male and 2 female).

Diving

Canada's diving team consisted of 12 (six per gender) athletes and was officially named on 1 March 2018.

Men

Women

Field hockey

Canada qualified both a men's and women's field hockey teams by being ranked in the top nine (excluding the host nation, Australia) among Commonwealth nations in the FIH Rankings as of 31 October 2017. Each team consisted of 18 athletes, for a total of 36.

Men's tournament

Roster
Canada's roster of 18 athletes was announced on 1 March 2018.

Brenden Bissett
David Carter
Taylor Curran
Adam Froese
Richard Hildreth
Gordon Johnston
Antoni Kindler
James Kirkpatrick
Balraj Panesar
Sukhi Panesar
Mark Pearson
Brandon Pereira
Keegan Pereira
Matthew Sarmento
Iain Smythe
John Smythe
Scott Tupper
Floris van Son

Pool A

Seventh place match

Women's tournament

Roster
Canada's roster of 18 athletes was announced on 16 March 2018.

Rachel Donohoe
Hannah Haughn
Danielle Hennig
Karli Johansen
Shanlee Johnston
Caashia Karringten
Kathleen Leahy
Alison Lee
Lauren Logush
Sara McManus
Stephanie Norlander
Madeline Secco
Natalie Sourisseau
Brienne Stairs
Kaitlyn Williams
Amanda Woodcroft
Nicole Woodcroft
Katherine Wright

Pool B

Fifth place match

Gymnastics

Canada's gymnastics team consisted of 13 gymnasts (10 in artistic and 3 in rhythmic). The official team was announced on 22 February 2018.

Artistic
Men
Team & Individual Qualification

Individual Finals

Women
Team & Individual Qualification

Individual Finals

Rhythmic
Team & Individual Qualification

Individual Finals

Lawn bowls

Bowls Canada announced a squad of ten athletes (five per gender) on 20 November 2017.

Men

Women

Rugby sevens

Men's tournament

Canada qualified a men's team of 12 athletes by being among the top nine ranked nations from the Commonwealth in the 2016–17 World Rugby Sevens Series ranking.

Roster

Connor Braid
Admir Cejvanovic
Andrew Coe
Justin Douglas
Mike Fuailefau
Lucas Hammond
Nathan Hirayama
Harry Jones
Isaac Kaay
Pat Kay
John Moonlight
Matt Mullins
Tevaughn Campbell (reserve)

Pool C

Women's tournament

Canada's women's team qualified as being one of the top four eligible teams from the 2016–17 World Rugby Women's Sevens Series.

Roster
Canada's 13 member roster was officially confirmed on 2 April 2018.

Brittany Benn
Caroline Crossley
Hannah Darling
Bianca Farella
Julia Greenshields
Sara Kaljuvee
Ghislaine Landry
Megan Lukan
Kayla Moleschi
Breanne Nicholas
Natasha Watcham-Roy
Charity Williams
Olivia Apps (reserve)

Pool A

Semi-finals

Bronze medal match

Shooting

Canada's shooting team consisted of four athletes (three male and one female).

Men

Open

Squash

Canada's squash team of two athletes was named on 30 January 2018.

Individual

Doubles

Swimming

Canada's swimming team was scheduled to consist of 44 swimmers (30 able bodied and 14 para-swimmers). On 26 September 2017 the able bodied team of 26 swimmers (10 male and 16 female) was announced. A team of 11 para swimmers (3 men and 8 women) was announced on 18 January 2018. So the team size was 37 swimmers.

Men

Athletes with stars beside their names only race in the preliminary

Women

Para

Table tennis

Canada's table tennis team of six athletes (three per gender) was named on 21 December 2017. Canada's table tennis team also consisted of two para sport athletes.

Singles

Doubles

Team

Para-sport

Triathlon

Canada named its triathlon team of six athletes (three per gender) on 13 November 2017.

Individual

Mixed Relay

Weightlifting

Canada qualified 11 weightlifters (5 men and 6 women). A 12th weightlifter was on the team (Edouard Freve-Guerin) but did not compete.

Men

Women

Wrestling

Canada's wrestling team consisted of 12 athletes (six male and six female). The team was announced on 2 March 2018.

Repechage Format

Group Stage Format

Nordic Format

See also
Canada at the 2018 Winter Olympics
Canada at the 2018 Winter Paralympics
Canada at the 2018 Summer Youth Olympics

References

Nations at the 2018 Commonwealth Games
Canada at the Commonwealth Games
2018 in Canadian sports